Newfound River may refer to:

The Newfound River (New Hampshire)
The Newfound River (Virginia)

There are also "Newfound Creek" features located in Kentucky, North Carolina and Alabama.